Ashton Cricket Club is an English cricket team, based in the town of Ashton-under-Lyne in Tameside, Greater Manchester. The club plays its home games at Rayner Lane, and competed in the Central Lancashire Cricket League [CLL] from 1928 to 2015 doing the quadruple of winning the 1st and 2nd XI Championships, Wood Cup and Aggregate Cup in 1940. The club last won the prestigious Wood Cup in 1964 and 1965. From 2015 - 2017 the CLL amalgamated with the Saddleworth League to form the short-lived Pennine Cricket League. From 2018 the club will play in the Greater Manchester Cricket League [GMCL].

Honours
First Division: 1933, 1940 
Wood Cup: 1940, 1950, 1964, 1965 
Second Division: 1940, 1964

External link: CLL club information
External link: Ashton Cricket Club Website

Central Lancashire League cricket clubs
Sport in Tameside
Ashton-under-Lyne
Cricket in Greater Manchester